Ward may refer to:

People
 Ward Armstrong (born 1956), American trial lawyer
 Ward Bennett (1917–2003), American designer, artist and sculptor
 Ward Beysen (1941–2005), Belgian politician and Freemason
 Ward R. Bliss (1855-1905), Pennsylvania State Representative
 Ward Boston (1923–2008), American attorney
 Ward Bowlby (1834–1917), Canadian lawyer and politician
 Ward Nicholas Boylston (1747–1828), American merchant and philanthropist
 Ward Brackett (1914–2006), American artist
 Ward Brehm, American entrepreneur
 Ward W. Briggs (born 1945), American classicist and historian of classical studies
 Ward Burton (born 1961), American stock car racing driver
 Ward Chamberlin (born 1921), former president of WETA-TV
 Ward Cheney (1813–1876), manufacturer of silk fabrics
 Ward Chipman (1754–1824), American lawyer and judge
 Ward Chipman, Jr. (1787–1851), American lawyer and judge
 Ward Christensen (born 1945), American entrepreneur
 Ward Churchill (born 1947), American author and political activist
 Ward Connerly (born 1939), American political activist and businessman
 Ward Cornell (1924–2000), Canadian broadcaster
 Ward Costello (1919–2009), American actor and composer
 Ward Crutchfield (1928–2016), American politician and member of the Tennessee Senate for the Democratic party
 Ward Cuff (1914–2002), American football player
 Ward Cunningham (born 1949), American computer programmer
 Ward Darley (1903–1979), American educator and physician
 Ward Edmonds (1908–1930), American pole vaulter
 Ward Edwards (1927–2005), American psychologist
 Ward Edwards (politician) (born 1930), American politician and member of the Georgia House of Representatives for the Democratic party
 Ward Elcock (born 1947), Canadian civil servant
 Ward Elliott (born 1937), American political scientist and professor
 Ward V. Evans (c. 1880–1957), chemist and professor at Northwestern University
 Ward Farnsworth (born 1967), dean of the University of Texas School of Law
 Ward Forrest (born 1954), American soccer player
 Ward Gibson (1921–1958), American professional basketball player
 Ward Goodenough (1919–2013), American anthropologist
 Ward J. M. Hagemeijer, American author
 Ward Hawkins (1912–1990), American author
 Ward Haylett (1895–1990), coach of track and field at Kansas State University
 Ward Hermans (1897–1992), Belgian Flemish nationalist politician and writer
 Ward Hunt (1810–1886), American jurist and politician
 Ward M. Hussey (1920–2009), American lawyer
 Ward Jones, South African scholar
 Ward Just (1935–2019), American writer
 Ward Keeler, American anthropologist
 Ward Kimball (1914–2002), American animator for the Walt Disney Studios
 Ward Lambert (1888–1958),  American basketball and baseball coach
 Ward Hill Lamon (1828–1893), American personal friend and self-appointed bodyguard of Abraham Lincoln
 Ward Lernout (born 1931), Flemish painter
 Ward Maule (1833–1913), Indian-born English clergyman and cricketer
 Ward McAllister (1827–1895), American attorney
 Ward McAllister (actor) (1891–1981), American film actor 
 Ward McIntyre (1930–2007), American television and radio personality
 Ward McLanahan (1883–1974),  American track and field athlete
 Ward Meese (1897–1968), American football player
 Ward Melville (1887–1977), American philanthropist and businessman
 Ward Miller (1902–1984), American politician and member of the U.S. House of Representatives for the Republican party
 Ward Miller (1884–1958), American professional baseball player
 Ward Moore (1903–1978), working name of American writer Joseph Ward Moore
 Ward Morehouse (1895–1966), American theater critic
 Ward Morehouse (activist) (1929–2012), Indian anti-corporate activist
 Ward Morehouse III (born 1945), American author and playwright
 Ward O′Neill (born 1951), Australian illustrator and caricaturist
 Ward B. Pafford (1911–2011), fourth president of the University of West Georgia
 H. Ward Page (1876–1949), American football coach
 Ward Perry (born 1970), Canadian voice actor
 William Ward Pigman (1910–1977), American biologist and suspected Soviet spy, also known as Ward Pigman
 Ward Pinkett (1906–1937), American jazz trumpeter
 Ward C. Pitfield, Jr. (1925–2021), Canadian financier
 Ward Plummer (1940–2020), American physicist
 Ward Prentice (1886–1969), Australian rugby player
 Ward Preston (1966–1997), American production designer and art director
 Ward Ritchie (1905–1996), American printer and writer
 Ward Russell (born 1978), American cinematographer
 Ward Sutherland, Canadian Politician
 Ward Sutton, American illustrator
 Ward Swingle (1927–2015), American vocalist and jazz musician
 Ward Sylvester, American producer
 Ward Thomas (television executive) (born 1923), British television executive
 Ward Walsh (born 1947), American football player
 Ward Weaver III (born 1963), American convicted murderer and rapist
 Ward Wettlaufer (1935–2016), American amateur golfer
 Ward Whitt (born 1942), American professor of operations research and management sciences
 Ward Williams (1923–2005), American professional basketball player
 Ward Wilson, British nuclear policy analyst
 Ward Wood (1924–2001), American actor and television writer

Stage name, pen name or nickname
 Wardell Ward Bond (1903–1960), American actor
 Ward Brennan, pseudonym of Australian writer Leonard Frank Meares (1921–1993)
 Ward Ruyslinck, pseudonym of Belgian writer Raymond De Belser (1929–2014)
 nickname of Edward Sels (born 1941), Belgian professional road bicycle racer

Fictional characters
 Ward Cameron, a main character in Netflix series Outer Banks (TV series), played by Charles Esten
 Ward Cleaver, in the television sitcom Leave It to Beaver
 Ward Meachum, from Marvel Comics' Iron Fist
 Ward Zabac, in the video game Final Fantasy VIII

See also

 Howard
 Edward
 Hereward